Warsaw cross-city line is a 7 km railway line crossing Central Warsaw in the east–west direction. Opened in 1933 and electrified in 1936, it initially had two tracks, with an additional two added in 1967.  The central part of the line is in a tunnel, which is 2226m long. It then crosses the Vistula by the Średnicowy railway bridge 470.15 m long located between Poniatowski Bridge and Świętokrzyski Bridge.

The line provides a direct link between Warszawa Wschodnia and Warszawa Zachodnia stations.  The pre-1945 Warszawa Główna was located approximately halfway down the line. The station has been replaced by Warszawa Śródmieście and later supplemented by Warszawa Centralna, which is located to the west of the old station.

Since the 1970s, the older (southern) pair of tracks is used by regional and commuter trains run (until 2005) by PKP/Polregio, and since then by Koleje Mazowieckie and Szybka Kolej Miejska. The regional trains use Warszawa Stadion, Warszawa Powiśle, Warszawa Śródmieście PKP and Warszawa Ochota stations (listed east-to-west), the long-distance trains use Warszawa Centralna. A third set of tracks, which extend as far as the Warszawa Śródmieście WKD railway station, are used by the Warszawska Kolej Dojazdowa (WKD) suburban light rail line.

Gallery

References

Buildings and structures in Warsaw
Railway lines in Poland
Transport in Warsaw
1933 establishments in Poland
Underground commuter rail